Bywy Creek is a stream in the U.S. state of Mississippi.

Bywy Creek is a name derived from the Choctaw language meaning "leaning white oak". Variant names are "Big Bywiah Creek", "Big Bywy", "Big Bywyah", "By Wy", "By Wyah", and "Bywyah".

References

Rivers of Mississippi
Rivers of Choctaw County, Mississippi
Mississippi placenames of Native American origin